Ryan Nawrocki (born 1983/1984) is an American politician and communications professional. He is a member of the Maryland House of Delegates for District 7A in north Baltimore County, Maryland. He was previously a candidate for the Baltimore County Council in District 6 in 2010 and 2018.

Background
Nawrocki attended St. Mary's College of Maryland, where he earned a Bachelor of Arts degree in political science, public policy, economics, and sociology, and Johns Hopkins University, where he earned a master's degree in public administration. After graduating, he started his own companies, including a medical aesthetics practice and a CBD company.

Nawrocki first got involved in politics by working in the Maryland Transit Administration, at which time he was the youngest appointee in the administration of Maryland governor Bob Ehrlich.

In 2010, Nawrocki unsuccessfully ran for the Baltimore County Council. He was defeated by Democratic nominee Cathy Bevins by 503 votes.

After his 2010 loss, Nawrocki began working as a spokesman to U.S. Representative Andy Harris, eventually becoming Harris' communication director. In January 2016, Nawrocki was appointed as senior director for the Maryland Transit Administration. Nawrocki also operated his own public relations firm, Red White and Blue LLC, which was hired by Maryland Environmental Service director Roy McGrath at a cost of $10,000 per month for work that included "challenge coins", writing remarks for senior staff including McGrath, note cards, and installation of new artwork in conference room.

Nawrocki once again challenged Bevins in the 2018 councilmanic elections, receiving endorsements from Ehrlich, Harris, and former county executive Roger B. Hayden. Bevins again defeated Nawrocki by 3,594 votes, or 8.5 percent.

In February 2022, Nawrocki announced his candidacy for the Maryland House of Delegates in District 7A. In May 2022, incumbent state Delegate Kathy Szeliga announced that she would run on a ticket with Nawrocki over state Delegate Joseph C. Boteler III. The two were also endorsed by state Senator J. B. Jennings and county councilmember David Marks. Nawrocki won the Republican primary, coming in second place behind Szeliga with 27.6 percent of the vote. He defeated autistic rights advocate Lydia X. Z. Brown in the general election.

In the legislature
Nawrocki was sworn into the Maryland House of Delegates on January 11, 2023. He is a member of the House Environment and Transportation Committee.

Personal life
Nawrocki is married to his wife Lauren. Together, the couple has four children, and lives in Middle River, Maryland.

In November 2007, Nawrocki's then-girlfriend, now wife, twice called police to report a physical altercation between her and Nawrocki. In the first report, filed November 11, 2007, Nawrocki allegedly pushed her during an argument; Nawrocki denied it and she was not injured. In the second report, filed five days later, she told police that Nawrocki "hit her in the mouth, splitting her lip and then pushed her to the floor" during an argument at their Towson home. The report also alleges that Nawrocki "began to choke her and she had to dig her fingernails into his arms and back to make him let her go." Nawrocki was never charged with a crime in the incident and says the claims in the report were an exaggeration to police. His wife also said in an interview with The Baltimore Sun that the police reports don't represent what really happened. The police reports became relevant when he ran for county council in 2018, when protesters involved in women's organizations picketed outside Nawrocki campaign events holding signs that accused him of domestic violence. Nawrocki accused his opponent, incumbent county councilmember Cathy Bevins, of sending the protesters to his event, an accusation which Bevins called "absolutely ridiculous".

Electoral history

References

External links
 

1980s births
21st-century American politicians
Johns Hopkins University alumni
Living people
St. Mary's College of Maryland alumni
Businesspeople from Maryland
Republican Party members of the Maryland House of Delegates